Blunt’s flat-body or purple carrot-seed moth (Depressaria depressana) is a moth of the family Depressariidae. It is found in most of Europe. It is also found in the Near East, North Africa, the eastern part of the Palearctic realm and since 2009 in North America. In the former USSR, it is distributed in the entire European part except for the Far North. It is also found in the northern Caucasus and Transcaucasia (Georgia and Armenia), in Kazakhstan, Central Asia (Kyrgyzstan, Tajikistan), the south of Siberia (Tomsk, Novosibirsk regions and Altai Territory), and the Russian Far East (Primorskii Territory). It is an introduced species in North America, where it has been reported from Québec and Ontario.

The wingspan is 14–20 mm. Adults are on wing from March to May. There is one generation in the north. There are two generations in the northern Caucasus and up to three generations in the south of Ukraine.

The larvae feed on Daucus carota, Pimpinella, Pastinaca, Seseli and Peucedanum oreoselinum.

Gallery

References

External links
Swedish Moths
Fauna Europaea
Species information

Moths described in 1775
Depressaria
Moths of Europe
Moths of Asia
Moths of Africa
Moths of North America
Taxa named by Johan Christian Fabricius